is a former Japanese baseball player.  He played professionally for the Yokohama BayStars and the Orix BlueWave. From 2003 to 2004, Mizuo played for minor league affiliates of Major League Baseball's Anaheim Angels.

References
Career statistics at Baseball Cube.

1968 births
Arkansas Travelers players
Japanese expatriate baseball players in the United States
Living people
Orix BlueWave players
People from Toyonaka, Osaka
Salt Lake Stingers players
Seibu Lions players
Yokohama Taiyō Whales players
Yokohama BayStars players